The Central Bank of Nigeria Act 1958 (No 24) or CBN Act established the Central Bank of Nigeria. The bank commenced operations on July 1, 1959.

The Central Bank of Nigeria Act 1958 was repealed by section 54(2) of the Central Bank of Nigeria Decree 1991. It in turn was replaced by the Central Bank of Nigeria Act 2007.

Notes

References
Trendtex v Central Bank of Nigeria (1977) 64 International Law Reports 111 at 116, 118, 136, 137 and 147, CA Google Books
Mwalimu, Charles. The Nigerian Legal System. Peter Lang. 2009. Volume 2. Page 602 et seq.

Further reading
 

Law of Nigeria
Central Bank of Nigeria